Nicolas Hyacinthe Gautier (1774, Loudéac–1809) was a French general of the Napoleonic Wars.

He was fatally injured at the Battle of Wagram, and died in Vienna a week later.

His name is inscribed on column 18 of the Arc de Triomphe.

References
Vicomte Révérend, Armorial du premier empire, tome 2, Honoré Champion, libraire, Paris, 1897, p. 218.
Prosper Jean Levot, Biographie Bretonne, recueil de notice sur tous les bretons qui se sont fait un nom Éditeur : Cauderan, Vannes et Dumoulin, Paris, 1852

1774 births
1809 deaths
Generals of the First French Empire
People from Côtes-d'Armor
Names inscribed under the Arc de Triomphe
French military personnel killed in the Napoleonic Wars
Officiers of the Légion d'honneur